Georgetown is a town in Sagadahoc County, Maine, United States. The population was 1,058 at the 2020 census. Home to Reid State Park, the town is part of the Portland–South Portland–Biddeford, Maine Metropolitan Statistical Area. Located on an island accessible by car from the mainland, Georgetown includes the villages of Five Islands, Georgetown, Bay Point, Marrtown, West Georgetown and Robinhood. It is a popular tourist destination.

History

Abenaki Indians called the island Erascohegan, possibly meaning "good spear-fishing." Other interpretations of the word suggest that it meant "a watching place." John Parker, a fisherman from Bedfordshire, England, purchased it in 1649 from Chief Mowhotiwormet, commonly known as Chief Robinhood, for a hogshead of rum and some pumpkins. Parker built the first permanent homestead on what eventually became known as Parker's Island.

The Kennebec River valley was attacked and burned in 1676 during King Philip's War, then again in 1689 at the outset of King William's War, and was not resettled until after the 1713 Treaty of Portsmouth. The town of Newtown-on-Arrowsic was rebuilt in 1714 on the southern end of Arrowsic Island, which was incorporated in 1716 by the Massachusetts General Court as Georgetown-on-Arrowsic, named for Fort St. George. The town's boundaries were extended to encompass Parker's Island, Woolwich, Phippsburg and Bath (which included West Bath). Abandoned during Dummer's War and beleaguered during the French and Indian Wars, the region resettled slowly in the 1750s until peace was assured with the 1759 Fall of Quebec.

About half of Parker's Island provided grazing land, and some residents raised livestock and produced butter and cheese. In 1858, there were two sawmills, two shingle mills, a pailmaker and a shipbuilder. But the merchant marine and fishing were the town's principal occupations. By 1841, all the other parts of Georgetown had been set off and incorporated as towns, leaving Parker's Island with sole claim to the ancient name. Situated between the mouths of the Sheepscot and Kennebec rivers on the Gulf of Maine, Georgetown developed into a summer resort, attracting a number of prominent artists. The island is a noted site for bird watching.

Geography

Georgetown is located on an island near the mouth of the Kennebec River and Gulf of Maine, part of the Atlantic Ocean.

It is crossed by Maine State Route 127. The island is separated by water from Westport to the northeast, Southport to the east, Phippsburg to the west, Arrowsic to the northwest, and Woolwich to the north.

Demographics

2010 census
As of the census of 2010, there were 1,042 people, 469 households, and 298 families residing in the town. The racial makeup of the town was 97.1% White, 0.4% African American, 0.1% Native American, 0.8% Asian, 0.2% from other races, and 1.4% from two or more races. Hispanic or Latino of any race were 0.7% of the population.

There were 469 households, of which 22.2% had children under the age of 18 living with them, 55.7% were married couples living together, 5.1% had a female householder with no husband present, 2.8% had a male householder with no wife present, and 36.5% were non-families. 29.9% of all households were made up of individuals, and 11.3% had someone living alone who was 65 years of age or older. The average household size was 2.22 and the average family size was 2.77.

The median age in the town was 49.6 years. 18.6% of residents were under the age of 18; 4.5% were between the ages of 18 and 24; 19.6% were from 25 to 44; 37% were from 45 to 64; and 20.3% were 65 years of age or older. The gender makeup of the town was 50.1% male and 49.9% female.

2000 census
As of the census of 2000, there were 1,020 people, 441 households, and 287 families residing in the town. The racial makeup of the town was 98.92% White, 0.10% African American, 0.49% Asian, 0.10% from other races, and 0.39% from two or more races. Hispanic or Latino of any race were 0.98% of the population.

There were 441 households, out of which 24.9% had children under the age of 18 living with them, 57.1% were married couples living together, 5.7% had a female householder with no husband present, and 34.9% were non-families. 27.7% of all households were made up of individuals, and 9.8% had someone living alone who was 65 years of age or older.  The average household size was 2.31 and the average family size was 2.84.

In the town, the population was spread out, with 21.3% under the age of 18, 6.7% from 18 to 24, 26.3% from 25 to 44, 29.4% from 45 to 64, and 16.4% who were 65 years of age or older.  The median age was 42 years. For every 100 females, there were 94.7 males.  For every 100 females age 18 and over, there were 97.3 males.

The median income for a household in the town was $47,813, and the median income for a family was $58,438. Males had a median income of $39,028 versus $24,792 for females. The per capita income for the town was $24,709.  About 3.9% of families and 6.8% of the population were below the poverty line, including 5.0% of those under age 18 and 5.2% of those age 65 or over.

Notable people 

 James Morton Carpenter, Ph.D., painter, art historian, founder of Colby College Art Museum, and founder of Colby's art history department
 Marsden Hartley, artist
 Dahlov Ipcar, artist and children's author, daughter of Marguerite and William Zorach
 Gaston Lachaise, sculptor
 William Lithgow (judge), colonial military officer
 Arthur Noble, colonial military officer
 Laura E. Richards, children's author
 Marguerite Zorach, artist
 William Zorach, artist

Education
Georgetown Central School

Sites of interest
 Ledgemere Nature Preserve
 Georgetown Historical Society & Museum
 Josephine Newman Wildlife Sanctuary
 Perkins Island Light
 Reid State Park
 Seguin Island Light

References

Further reading
 Brief Description and History of Georgetown, Maine

External links
 Town of Georgetown, Maine
 Patten Free Library
 Lower Kennebec Regional Land Trust
 Friends of Perkins Island Light 
 Friends of Seguin Island Lighthouse
 Plan of Georgetown in 1839 from the Maine Memory Network
 Maine Genealogy: Georgetown, Sagadahoc County, Maine

 
Portland metropolitan area, Maine
Towns in Sagadahoc County, Maine